The Three Couriers is a 1929 comedy thriller novel by the British writer Compton Mackenzie. It was inspired by his own experiences working for British intelligence during the First World War. It is set in Southeastern Europe, and features the fictional British spy Roger Waterson who had previously appeared in Extremes Meet. Thriller writer Eric Ambler was an admirer of the novel.

References

Bibliography
 Burton, Alan. Historical Dictionary of British Spy Fiction. Rowman & Littlefield, 2016.

1929 British novels
Novels by Compton Mackenzie
British thriller novels
British spy novels
Cassell (publisher) books
Doubleday, Doran books